This is a  list of video games published and/or developed by 505 Games.

Developed

Published

As 505 GameStreet

As 505 Games

Notes

 
505